Vladimir Kozlov (born 1 August 1959) is a Soviet former speed skater. He competed in the men's 500 metres event at the 1984 Winter Olympics.

References

External links
 

1959 births
Living people
Soviet male speed skaters
Olympic speed skaters of the Soviet Union
Speed skaters at the 1984 Winter Olympics
Sportspeople from Oskemen